Bilqees Urf Bitto is a Pakistani drama television serial first aired on 1 April 2017 on Urdu 1. It starred Hira Salman and Fahad Mirza in leading roles. The serial consists of 21 episodes. It aired its last episode on 28 August 2017 and was replaced by Mujhay Jeenay Do.

Plot
A tragic love story of Bitto and Sarmad, in which Bitto is a typical village girl who has always been crushing over her village's Saaein (lord), Babar, since childhood. Bitto is a young girl who always tries to come into the eyes of Babar. However, when she actually does, she accidentally drops a tray of mathai (sweets) onto his shoes, inducing Babar to insult her badly. Later, Bitto is having a mud fight with her friend, but accidentally throws mud onto Babar, who was passing by. Angrily, he labels her as an illiterate “jahil” that makes Bitto aggressive and disturbed. She decides to get over with this label and leaves her small village, going to her friend's home in some urban locality/city. She somehow makes her family agree to let her go and earn in city.

She goes to her friend's home and there she meets Sarmad, a mutual between her and her friend. Eventually, she gets close with Sarmad, teaching her how to dress and act more sophisticatedly. Slowly falling in love - Bitto promises Sarmad that she will return to him after a visit to her village.

Upon returning to the village, Babar notices Bitto now that she is acting more sophisticatedly. He offers to marry her - an offer she cannot pass up, as she has had a crush on him since she was young. Now married, Sarmad is left wondering why Bitto is avoiding him.

Eventually, Sarmad visits her village, as he had begun to miss her. However, he is shocked to find that she is now married to someone else.

Cast

Main
Hira Salman as Bilqees alias Bittu
Fahad Mirza as Sarmad

Recurring
Sadia Ghaffar
Noman Masood
Farah Nadeem as Babar's mother
Nida Mumtaz as Bittio's mother	
Tanveer Jamal
Mehwish Qureshi
Saima Chandio
Fahad Rehmani

References

External links
Official website

Urdu 1 original programming